Events from the year 1851 in Germany.

Incumbents 
 King of Bavaria – Maximilian II
 King of Hanover –
 Ernest Augustus till 18 November 1851
 George V after 18 November 1851
 King of Prussia – Frederick William IV
 King of Saxony – Frederick Augustus II

Events 
 February 1 – Brandtaucher, the oldest surviving submersible craft, sinks during acceptance trials in the German port of Kiel, but the designer, Wilhelm Bauer, and the two crew escape successfully.

Births 
 March 24 – Friedrich von Scholtz, German general (d. 1927)
 April 1 – Bruno von Mudra, German general (d. 1931)
 May 7 – Adolf von Harnack, German Lutheran theologian, church historian (d. 1930)

 May 20 – Emile Berliner, German-born American telephone and recording pioneer (d. 1929)
 September 21 – Arthur Schuster, German-British physicist (d. 1934)
 November 27 – Friedrich Sixt von Armin, German general (d. 1936)

Deaths 

 January 10 – Karl Freiherr von Müffling, Prussian field marshal (b. 1775)
 January 21 – Albert Lortzing, German composer (b. 1801)
 February 18 – Carl Gustav Jacob Jacobi, German mathematician (b. 1804)
 July 17 – Roger Sheaffe, British general (b. 1763)
 November 18- Ernest Augustus, King of Hanover (b. 1771)
 December 19 – Karl Drais, German inventor (b. 1785)

References 

 
Years of the 19th century in Germany